Daniel MacAskill (born 23 December 1985) is a Scottish trials cyclist, from Dunvegan on the Isle of Skye. He works professionally as a street trials and mountain bike rider for Santa Cruz Bicycles.

Life and career
In April 2009, he released a five-minute street trials video to YouTube, filmed by his flatmate Dave Sowerby. This video gained widespread media attention, featuring stunts performed by MacAskill set to  "The Funeral" by Band of Horses.

As of April 2009, MacAskill had been practising several hours per day for more than 12 years. He gave up his job as a mechanic so he could ride full-time and now lives in Glasgow. In June 2009, MacAskill appeared in the music video for Doves' single "Winter Hill".

In September 2009, MacAskill was the focus of TV advert filmed by The Leith Agency on behalf of Scottish jobs website s1jobs.com.

On 16 November 2010 MacAskill released a new video Way Back Home produced by Red Bull Media House. The video showcases locations around Scotland including Edinburgh Castle, North Berwick, wartime bunkers on the island of Inchgarvie beneath the Forth Bridge and the Cruachan Dam in the Scottish Highlands. In May 2011 Leica Camera released a Go Play promotional video featuring him doing tricks in the city of Cape Town. On 9 August 2011 Cut Media released a video named Industrial Revolutions directed by Stu Thomson. The video, set to "The Wolves" by Ben Howard, features MacAskill doing tricks in an abandoned Scottish iron works. It was created for Mike Christie's Channel 4 documentary Concrete Circus.

In 2011 MacAskill, along with Inspired Bicycles, released his signature trials frame, the "Inspired Skye".

In 2012, MacAskill performed the stunts for the movie Premium Rush. MacAskill is currently managed by the German agency Rasoulution.

In early May 2013, MacAskill was invited to Taichung, Taiwan by a sponsorship partner, Lezyne, to film a riding video titled Danny MacAskill in Taiwan - powered by Lezyne. In summer 2013, MacAskill published a trial biking project on YouTube called Imaginate which had been shot over 18 months produced by Mike Christie for Red Bull Media House and directed by Stu Thomson. In fewer than three weeks, the video had received over four million views. In May 2014, MacAskill released another video through Red Bull Media House called Epecuen, which was shot on location in Epecuén, Argentina. The town has been submerged underwater since 1985 for most of the time, and the video opens with its only resident speaking about it. As of April 2016, the video has accumulated over 10 million views.

In October 2014, MacAskill and long-term collaborator Stu Thomson of Cut Media released a film titled The Ridge. It was filmed on his home island, the Isle of Skye, along the steep and rocky Cuillin Ridge. In the first five days, the video on YouTube garnered over 10 million views.  The film was accompanied by a BBC Scotland programme Riding the Ridge that documented Danny and the Cut Media crew as they created the viral film. Cascadia, also produced by Cut Media, appeared in November 2015.

The video "Danny Macaskill's Gymnasium" was released on 7 January 2020, featuring "I'm on My Way" by The Proclaimers.

In January 2021, Macaskill released the video Danny MacAskill - The Slabs, featuring him riding down a 500-meter section of the remote Dubh Slabs which rise out from Loch Coruisk on the Isle of Skye, Scotland. The video was filmed in September 2020 when Scotland's COVID-19 restrictions were temporarily eased and was released with the song "No Cars Go" by Arcade Fire. The video gained over a million views within two days of being released.

Filmography

References

External links
 
 Imaginate (7-minute film)
 The making of s1jobs's TV advert featuring Danny MacAskill

People from the Isle of Skye
Scottish male cyclists
Living people
Year of birth missing (living people)
Mountain bike trials riders